The 2015–16 Austrian Cup was the 82nd season of Austria's nationwide football cup competition. It began with the matches of the First Round on 17 July 2015 and ended on 20 May 2016 with the final at Wörthersee Stadion in Klagenfurt. Red Bull Salzburg won the title for the third consecutive time by beating Admira Wacker Mödling 5–0. As Salzburg had also won the 2015–16 Austrian Bundesliga and therefore qualified for the 2016–17 UEFA Champions League, the 2016–17 UEFA Europa League spot reserved for the cup winners went to the domestic league runners-up Rapid Wien.

First round 
The matches took place between 17 and 19 July 2015. The draw was made on 24 June 2015.

|-
| colspan="3" style="background:#fcc;"|

|-
| colspan="3" style="background:#fcc;"|

|-
| colspan="3" style="background:#fcc;"|

|}

Second round 
The matches took place on 22 and 23 September 2015. The draw was made on 2 August 2015.

|-
| colspan="3" style="background:#fcc;"|

|-
| colspan="3" style="background:#fcc;"|

|}

Third round 
The matches took place between 27 October and 4 November 2015. The draw was made on 27 September 2015.

|-
| colspan="3" style="background:#fcc;"|

|-
| colspan="3" style="background:#fcc;"|

|-
| colspan="3" style="background:#fcc;"|

|}

Quarter-finals 
The matches took place on 9 and 10 February 2016. The draw was made on November 8, 2015.

|-
| colspan="3" style="background:#fcc;"|

|-
| colspan="3" style="background:#fcc;"|

|}

Semi-finals 
The matches took place on 19 and 20 April 2016. The draw was made on 14 February 2016.

|-
| colspan="3" style="background:#fcc;"|

|-
| colspan="3" style="background:#fcc;"|

|}

Final 
The final was played on 19 May 2016 at the Wörthersee Stadion in Klagenfurt.

|-

|}

Details

References

External links 

  

Austrian Cup seasons
Cup
Austrian Cup